Gatis is a Latvian masculine given name borne by over 5,000 men in Latvia. The etymology of the name is disputed. Some of the suggestions include a possible relation to the Latvian word gatavs ("ready", "mature"). Other versions suggest its possible relation to an old Latvian word "gātis" meaning gates or river source. Another version suggests that the word is derived from the German name Gotthard. Its name-day is celebrated on 8 January.

The name is one of the relatively few surviving names of indigenous origin from among the great number that were revived or introduced during the Latvian National Awakening of the late 19th and early 20th centuries.

Individuals
The name Gatis may refer to:
 Gatis Čakšs (born 1995) Latvian javelin thrower
 Gatis Gūts (born 1976), Latvian bobsleigher
 Gatis Jahovičs (born 1984), Latvian basketball player
 Gatis Kalniņš (born 1981), Latvian footballer
 Gatis Kandis (born 1981), Latvian comedian
 Gatis Smukulis (born 1987), Latvian cyclist
 Gatis Tseplis (born 1971), Latvian ice hockey defenceman

References

Sources
 Pilsonības un Migrācijas Lietu Parvalde (PMLP): Office of Citizenship and Migration Affairs personal name database

Bibliography
 Latkovskis, Leonards, 1971: Latgalu uzvordi, palames un dzymtas II Munich: Latgalu izdevniecība 
 Siliņš, K., 1990: Latviešu personvārdu vārdnīca. Rīga: Zinātne 

Latvian masculine given names